The Svartisen Power Station  is a hydroelectric power station located in the municipality Meløy in Nordland, Norway. The station is owned by Statkraft.

See also

 Storglomvatnet

References 

Hydroelectric power stations in Norway
Buildings and structures in Nordland
Dams in Norway